D'Arcy Island is an 83-ha island in Haro Strait, south of Sidney Island and east of the Saanich Peninsula (Vancouver Island). It is the southernmost of the Gulf Islands and is included in its entirety in the Gulf Islands National Park Reserve.

History
The island was used as a leper colony for Chinese immigrants from 1891 to 1924, when the inhabitants were moved to Bentinck Island, closer to Victoria.  Ruins of the buildings built during that time are still visible.

D'Arcy Island's proximity to the United States border was exploited by famous American bootlegger Roy Olmstead in the smuggling of Canadian liquor, primarily whisky, to Washington State. His operation would transport the liquor from Victoria, British Columbia, to islands in Haro Strait, including D'Arcy, for later pickup by smaller craft that would move the contraband during rough weather, making it more difficult for the Coast Guard to detect them.

D'Arcy was declared a marine park in 1961, and included as part of the Gulf Islands National Park Reserve in 2003.

Access
D'Arcy is accessible by private watercraft only.

Camping
Gulf Islands National Park Reserve offers 7 marine-accessible backcountry campsites on D'Arcy. Facilities are limited to pit toilets and picnic tables. There is no potable water available, and no campfires are permitted. The Current Map and Hiking and Camping Information brochure provides updated camping fees .

References

External links
 Gulf Islands National Park Reserve
 

Greater Victoria
Islands of the Gulf Islands
Leper colonies